Karate kata competitions at the 2019 World Beach Games in Doha, Qatar were held on October 10 and October 11. The venue for the competition was at Mission Beach. Thirty-two athletes competed in each of the men's and women's events.

Qualification
A total of 64 athletes (32 of each gender) vie for the coveted spots with a maximum of two sent to compete for the best six world championship qualifiers. While the other NOCs might have one athlete per event, host nation Qatar will be ensured one quota place for each gender. The remaining 4 quotas will be eligible for each continental champions. The other remaining 6 quotas will be eligible for best five WKF ranking and one invitation place respectively.

Qualification summary

Men's qualification

Women's qualification

Medal summary

Medal table

Medalists

Participating nations

References

External links
Results book

Karate kata
2019
World Beach Games
Karate in Qatar